Heinz Schütz (born 25 February 1926) was a German field hockey player who competed in the 1952 Summer Olympics.

References

External links
 

1926 births
Possibly living people
German male field hockey players
Olympic field hockey players of Germany
Field hockey players at the 1952 Summer Olympics
Place of birth missing
20th-century German people